This is a list of records from the Gold Coast Football Club since its inception in the Australian Football League (AFL) in 2011 (top five of each record unless there have not been five occurrences of the record).

Individual records

Key

 Currently on the Gold Coast Suns' list.

Games

Most games

Most consecutive games

Age
Youngest players
Age on their debut

Oldest players
Age in their last game played

Height
Tallest players

Shortest players

Goalkicking
Most goals

Most goals in a season

Most goals in a game

Most seasons as leading goalkicker

Most goals on debut

Winning goals after the siren

Finals
Most premierships

Most grand final appearances

Most finals games

Most finals goals

Coaching
Most games coached

Most wins as coach

Highest winning percentage as coach

Awards
Most Brownlow Medals

Most club best and fairest awards

Team Game records

Scores
Biggest wins

Biggest losses

Highest score

Lowest score

Biggest comebacks

Biggest collapses

Streaks
Longest winning streaks

Longest losing streaks

Attendances
Top home attendances

Finals records
Finals appearances

Scores
Biggest wins

Biggest losses

Most finals wins in a row

Most finals losses in a row

Biggest comeback in a final

Biggest collapse in a final

Grand final records

Achievements 
Premierships
0 
Runners-up 0

Scores
Biggest wins

Biggest losses

Biggest comebacks

Biggest collapses

Win–loss record

References 

Gold Coast
Gold Coast
Gold Coast Suns
Gold Coast, Queensland-related lists